K. P. A. C. Lalitha was an Indian film and television actress, who predominantly appeared in Malayalam films and has few credits in Tamil. Lalitha, who hails from Kerala began her acting career at age 16 as a stage actor in the theatre group Kerala People's Arts Club (K. P. A. C.). She made her film debut in 1969 with the film Koottukudumbam, an adaptation of K. P. A. C.'s play of the same name. Since then, in a career spanning over five decades, she had acted in more than 550 feature films. She was two time National Film Awards winner for Best Supporting Actress and had won four Kerala State Film Awards for Second Best Actress. She chaired the Kerala Sangeetha Nataka Akademi.

Films

2011–2023

1991–2010

1969–1990

Dubbed voices

Television serials

Dramas
 Kakkaponnu
 Bali
 Aswamedham

Television shows
 Reality show as Judge 
Sundari Neeyum Sundaran Njanum
Bharthakkankarude Sradhakku
Comedy Stars season 2
Kerala's Favourite Film Actor
Other shows as herself
Lalithapachakam
Big Break
Amma Mazhavillu
Nalla Nalekkai
Samagamam
Lalitham @ 50
Ruchibhedam
Onathammamar
Lalitha Sundaramee Vishu
Dakshinamurthi Music Fest 2018 
Ente Ormakaliloode
Made for each other
Manam Thurannu
Nadanam Venulayam
Urvasi Theatres
 Ningalkkum Aakaam Kodeeshwaran
 Sangeetha Sangamam
 Sundari Neeyum Sundaran Njanum
 Comedy Utsavam
 Sell Me The Answer
 Comedy Super Nite
 Kathayilithu Jeevitham
 Badayi Bunglavu
 Annie's Kitchen
 Nere Chovve
 On Record
 Close encounter
 A Note Of Legacy
 Shoot n Show
 Katha Ithuvare
 My First Film
 Avar Kandumuttumbol
 Onnum Onnum Moonnu
 JB Junction
 Onakkodi
 Ini Njangal Parayam
 Smile Plz
 Annorikkal
 Lal Salam
 Vellithirayile Pennkaruth
 Ruchibhedam
 Yashodhamarum Yoyo Krishnanum

Music albums
 Ente Malayalam
 Chingapenninu Kannezhuthan
 Ochiravasan
 Amme Kaathukollanne
 Devaragam

Commercials
 Grandmas
 Chavara Matrimony
 ICL Gold Emotion
 LDF
 Radhas
 Kalliyath TMT

References

Actress filmographies
Indian filmographies